Dargah Pir Ratan Nath Jee is a Hindu temple located in Jhanda Bazar locality of Peshawar city, the capital of Khyber Pakhtunkhwa province of Pakistan. The temple is dedicated to Lord Shiva and Maha Shivratri is the main festival.

History
It is one of the few surviving Hindu temple in Peshawar, along with Kalibari Mandir and Goraknath Mandir, Gor Khatri. This is the only ongoing functional temple in daily use along with Kalibari Mandir. Court ordered the Evacuee Trust Property Board to open the Goraknath Mandir, Gor Khatri, which opens once a year on Diwali.

January 2016 attack
In January 2016, two unidentified assailants escaped after shooting dead the government appointed policeman on guard at the temple.

See also
 Hinduism in Pakistan

References

Hindu temples in Peshawar
Hindu temples in Khyber Pakhtunkhwa